The Power of Poison is an immersive science exhibit designed by the American Museum of Natural History in New York City. The exhibit explores poison’s roles in nature, health, history, literature, and myth.  The show attempts to unify various studies prevalent with the museum's research facilities in order to illustrate the fluidity between the fields. It was designed by the AMNH Exhibitions Lab.

Locations
 New York City: American Museum of Natural History, 16 November 2013 - 10 August 2014
 Atlanta, Georgia: Fernbank Museum of Natural History, 7 February 2015 - 3 May 2015

Layout
The exhibit has four major sections, each highlighting poison as viewed by a different branch of science.

Biology
Poison Alive
The exhibit opens with three small live animals, showing poison as a universal characteristic of the biosphere.
The Chocó Rainforest
Ascending a small platform, visitors enter a lengthy walkthrough diorama of Colombia’s dense Chocó lowland forest. As visitors walk through the rainforest, they encounter specimens that utilize poison in their daily lives. The purpose of the section is to examine poison in a context of multiple evolutionary strategies—including linked variations in the strength of a predator’s poison and the resistance of its prey.

Anthropology
Myths and Legends
Exiting the forest, visitors find themselves in a fairytale-like series of dioramas depicting poison in mythology. These include Grimm's Folktales, Alice in Wonderland and Macbeth. Curated by the museum's social sciences departments, a selection of prominent historical artifacts are incorporated into the dioramas, revealing ways humans have imagined the presence of poisons. These, in the words of the designers, are meant to show "the potent power of poison as a longstanding motif in fairy tales, legends, and children’s stories."
Poison in History
A winding gallery takes visitors past life-sized models of some of history's most famous poisonings, such as Mozart's supposed death, Cleopatra’s snakebite and Napoleon’s poisoning by arsenic.

Forensics
Dissecting Poison Theater
The "Dissecting Poison Theater" is a live show that describes how forensic anthropologists can detect poison. Visitors explore a real-world poisoning case that highlights advances in toxicology and forensics since the 19th century. This section is tied in with an iPad game, where visitors can solve their own forensic mystery.

Health Sciences
Poison by Accident
This section uses three large forced perspective dioramas to tell stories about poison's dangerous and mercurial nature.
Poison as Cure
The exhibit's finale takes guests through a diorama illustrating natural poisons that can ameliorate cancer, quinsy, laryngitis, croup, and other global health problems.

References

American Museum of Natural History
Exhibitions in the United States
Poisons
Science exhibitions